Pseudoctomeris sulcatus is a species of barnacle, the only member of the genus Pseudoctomeris. It  has an eight-plated shell wall with the rostrum partially fused with adjacent rostrolatera. The suture lines are visible only from the inside, thus in exterior view, the shell appears to have six wall plates. The basis is calcareous. Opercular plates are higher than wide, and not deeply articulated. These features and others show strong relationship to family Pachylasmatidae, and taxonomic revision of Pachylasmatidae has resulted in the transfer of Pseudoctomeris from Chthamalidae to Pachylasmatidae.

Diagnostic soft part characteristics, as described in Poltarukha, 2006 include a tridentate mandible and presence of a multi-jointed caudal appendage.

As Pseudoctomeris is monotypic, the genus characters are necessarily the same as those of P. sulcatus.

Nomenclature and Synonymy

Pseudoctomeris 

 Pseudoctomeris , 1996; (original description).
 Type Species: Octomeris sulcata , 1932; original designation by Poltarukha, 1996:988.

Pseudoctomeris sulcata 

 Octomeris sulcata , 1932; (original description): 
 Pseudoctomeris sulcata , 1996; (generic reassignment): 2006; (supplemental description, discussion).
 Type locality: 
 Type specimens and repository:

Habitat and geographic range 

Pseudoctomeris is found in less agitated environments than most Chthamaloidea, preferring lower littoral to sublittoral habitats, on rocky shores.

Pseudoctomeris sulcatus range extends to South Japan, China, and Taiwan.

References

External links 

 WoRMS

Barnacles
Maxillopoda
Monotypic arthropod genera